This is an alphabetical list of the songs known to have been written or co-written by David Foster.

References

Bibliography

Foster